Tipu Sultan (born 5 January 1967) is a Bangladeshi politician. He has served as a member of the Jatiyo Sangshad since 2014, representing Barisal-3 for the Workers Party of Bangladesh

Background
Sultan is an advocate by profession

References

Living people
1967 births
Workers Party of Bangladesh politicians
10th Jatiya Sangsad members
Bangladeshi communists